Alan "AJ" MacGinty is an Irish-born professional rugby player, who represents the United States in international competition. He primarily plays as a fly-half. MacGinty plays club rugby for Premiership Rugby team Bristol Bears.

Early life
A graduate of Blackrock College, MacGinty played with the Blackrock College RFC academy before moving to New York on a visa where he began playing with NYAC. In 2012 MacGinty moved to Marietta, Georgia, where he began a master's degree in Sport Health Science and excelled on the rugby pitch at out-half for the Life Running Eagles.

Club career

Connacht
Following his participation in the 2015 Rugby World Cup, MacGinty was signed by Connacht for the 2015–16 Pro12 season. Connacht head coach Pat Lam said the province had been following MacGinty since the Pacific Nations Cup earlier in the year. MacGinty made his domestic debut for Connacht appearing off the bench in their 33–19 win over Benetton Treviso on 6 November 2015. MacGinty made his European debut on 14 November 2015 in the first match of the 2015–16 Challenge Cup, starting at fly-half and scoring nine points. MacGinty led Connacht to a 28–23 bonus point win over Edinburgh in March 2016 and "controlled matters expertly" to manage Connacht's fifth consecutive win and maintain first place in the Pro12.

He was pivotal in Connacht's Pro12 final win securing the team's first ever silverware.

Sale Sharks
In May 2016 it was announced that MacGinty would join English Premiership side Sale Sharks when his deal with Connacht finished in the summer, with n-capped Marnitz Boshoff taking his place at the province. MacGinty was signed as a replacement for outgoing  international Danny Cipriani.

Bristol Bears
On 10 November 2021 it was announced that MacGinty would be joining Bristol Bears at the end of the 21/22 season.

International career
In the U.S. team's last match of the 2015 Pacific Nations Cup against , MacGinty scored all of the team's points, including a last minute drop goal, to win the match 15–13. MacGinty was the U.S. team's leading scorer throughout the 2015 Pacific Nations Cup, scoring 44 points in three matches.

Following his performances in the Nations Cup, MacGinty was named in the American squad for the 2015 Rugby World Cup. He featured in three of the team's four games, starting in each of his appearances and scoring 25 points.

International tries

See also
 Rugby union in the United States

References

American rugby union players
United States international rugby union players
Irish emigrants to the United States
Connacht Rugby players
Rugby union fly-halves
Life University alumni
Blackrock College RFC players
1990 births
Living people
People educated at Blackrock College
Irish rugby union players
Rugby union players from Dublin (city)
Irish expatriate rugby union players
Irish expatriate sportspeople in the United States
Expatriate rugby union players in the United States
Naturalized citizens of the United States
Naturalised sports competitors
Irish expatriate sportspeople in England
Expatriate rugby union players in England
American expatriate sportspeople in England
American expatriate rugby union players